Yanachagana is a genus of moths belonging to the subfamily Tortricinae of the family Tortricidae. It consists of only one species, Yanachagana polyperla, which is found in Peru.

The wingspan is about 29 mm. The ground colour of the forewings is pearl white, consisting of three series of blotches separated by a rust brown fasciae dotted pearl. The hindwings are white cream, tinged and strigulated with brownish in the distal part.

Etymology
The generic name is refers to the name of the type locality of the typespecies. The specific name refers to the forewing pattern and is derived from Greek poly (meaning numerous) and Latin perla (meaning pearl).

See also
List of Tortricidae genera

References

Euliini